is a railway station in the city of Kamaishi, Iwate, Japan, operated by East Japan Railway Company (JR East).

Lines
Kosano Station is served by the Kamaishi Line, and is located 86.5 kilometers from the starting point of the line at Hanamaki Station.

Station layout
The station has a single island platform. The station has a Midori no Madoguchi staffed ticket office.

Platforms

History
Kosano Station opened on 15 June 1945. The station was absorbed into the JR East network upon the privatization of the Japanese National Railways (JNR) on 1 April 1987.

Passenger statistics
In fiscal 2018, the station was used by an average of 46 passenger daily (boarding passengers only).

Surrounding area
 
 Kosano Post Office
 Kamaishi City Library

See also
 List of railway stations in Japan

References

External links

  

Railway stations in Iwate Prefecture
Kamaishi Line
Railway stations in Japan opened in 1945
Kamaishi, Iwate
Stations of East Japan Railway Company